Ivan Vuković (born 17 September 1984) is a Montenegrin politician serving as the mayor of Podgorica since 2018. Before taking office, he worked as an Assistant Professor and Vice-Dean for International Cooperation at the Faculty of Political Science in Podgorica.

Early life 
Ivan Vuković was born on September 17, 1984 in Podgorica, where he finished both elementary school and high school.

Vuković completed his undergraduate and specialist studies in 2007 at the University of Montenegro, Faculty of Political Science (study program International Relations and Diplomacy). He was one of the top students in his class, with an average grade of A (9.7).

Shortly before the referendum in 2006, he was one of the student representatives in the Movement for Independence of Montenegro.

After completing his specialist studies (2006-2007), Vuković completed an internship at the Montenegro Ministry of Foreign Affairs, after which he enrolled in postgraduate studies in the Netherlands at Leiden University.

In 2008, Vuković defended his masters thesis on the topic of "European Integration and Political Competition in Montenegro: The Determinants of Party Consensus".

Upon returning to Montenegro (2008-2014) Vuković began working as a teaching assistant at the Faculty of Political Science of the University of Montenegro.

During 2010, Vuković wrote foreign policy columns for the daily newspaper Pobjeda.

From September to November 2013, Vuković conducted a PhD thesis research at Harvard University and in June 2014 defended his PhD thesis on Party Outcomes in Hybrid Regimes in the Western Balkans and Beyond at the Central European University in Budapest.

Academic career

In the period 2014–2015, Vuković acquired the title of Lecturer at the Faculty of Political Science; In November 2015 he was elected Assistant Professor and Vice-Dean for International Relations at the same Faculty.

Vuković spent academic year 2016–2017 at George Washington University as the first Fulbright Postdoctoral scholarship holder from Montenegro. During his stay in America, he taught there on the subject “Politics in Central and Eastern Europe”.

Vuković is fluent in English and has a good grasp of French.

Political career 
In 2018, Vuković publicly supported the presidential candidate of the Democratic Party of Socialists (DPS), Milo Đukanović.

In May 2018, he continued his political path as the holder of the coalition list “For the Good of the Citizens of Podgorica”, winning local election in Podgorica.

In July 2018, by secret ballot in the Capital City Assembly, Vuković was elected Mayor. Out of the total number of councilors (36), 35 voted for Vuković and one ballot was invalid.

On July 31, 2018, at age 34, Vuković began serving as the forty-third mayor of Podgorica. Vuković stated:

Bibliography

Publications 
 "Deinstitutionalising Power of Decision-Making Personalisation: the Paradigmatic Case of the Serbian Communist-Successor Party" (with Filip Milačić), chapter accepted for publishing in the book: "Institutionalisation of Political Parties: Comparative Cases", Rowman & Littlefield International/ECPR Press, London, 2018.
 "The Rise of the Politics of National Identity: New Evidence from Western Europe" (with Filip Milačić), article accepted for publishing in the magazine Ethnopolitics, 2017.
 “Minority Representation in Montenegro: Defying Balkan Standards” (with Filip Milačić), chapter in the book: “Beyond International Conditionality: Local Variations in Minority Representation in Central and South-Eastern Europe”, NOMOS Baden-Baden, Germany, 2017.
 “Party Organization in Montenegro”,chapter in the book: “Organizational Structures of Political Parties in Central and Eastern European Countries”, Jagiellonian University Press, Poland, 2016.
 “Die Verfassung Montenegros” (with Filip Milačić), Osteuropa-RECHT, Vol. 62, No. 3, 2016.
 “The Determinants of Party Consensus on European Integration in Montenegro“, Politička misao (Croatian Political Science Review), Vol. 52, No. 4-5, 2015. 
 “Population Censuses in Montenegro: A Century of National Identity ‘Repacking’”, Contemporary Southeastern Europe, Vol. 2, No. 2, 2015.
 “Political Dynamics of the Post-communist Montenegro: One-party Show“, Democratization, Vol. 22, No. 1, 2015.
 “Diverging Party Outcomes in Hybrid Regimes: The Cases of Croatia, Serbia, and Montenegro“, Romanian Journal of Political Science, Vol. 11, No. 2, 2011.
 “The Post-Communist Political Transition of Montenegro: Democratization Prior to Europeanization“, Contemporary European Studies, Vol. 2, No. 1, 2010.
 “Temeljne vrijednosti pravnog poretka Evropske unije“, Crna Gora u XXI stoljeću – U eri kompetitivnosti (“The Core Values of the EU Legal System“, Montenegro in the 21st Century – In the Era of Competitiveness), Montenegrin Academy of Sciences and Arts, Vol. 73, No. 1, 2010.
 “Rebuilding Leviathan: Political Competition and State Exploitation in Post-Communist Democracies”, by Anna Grzymala-Busse, Cambridge: Cambridge University Press. Book review published in Studies of Transition States and Societies, Vol. 2, No. 2, November 2010.

Research 
 2016-2017: Country expert (Montenegro), “Nations in Transit Report”, Freedom House
 2015-: Associate in the project, “Democracy, Political Participation and The Role of Political Parties in South-East Europe”, Friedrich-Ebert-Stiftung
 2014-: Associate in the project, “Censuses in South-East Europe”, a consortium of universities from the Western Balkans
 2013-: Project coordinator, “Identity Politics and Democratization in Austria and Montenegro”, University of Graz and University of Montenegro
 2013: Country expert (Montenegro), “Varieties of Democracy – V-Dem”, University Goteborg and Notre Dame University
 2013-2016: Associate in the project, “Developing Human Rights Education at the Heart of Higher Education”, EU Tempus project
 2013-2016: Associate in the project, “Development of Policy-Oriented Training Programmes in the Context of European Integration”, EU Tempus project
 2010-: Member, Centar za društvena istraživanja, Fakultet političkih nauka, Univerzitet Crne Gore (Center for social research, Faculty of Political Sciences, University of Montenegro)
 2009: Associate in the project, “Crna Gora u XXI vijeku – U eri kompetitivnosti” (Montenegro in XXI century – era of competition), Crnogorska akademija nauka i umjetnosti (Montenegrin Academy of Sciences and Arts)

References 

1984 births
Living people
Mayors of Podgorica
University of Montenegro alumni
Democratic Party of Socialists of Montenegro politicians
Montenegrin nationalists